The men's tournament in volleyball at the 1988 Summer Olympics was the 7th edition of the event at the Summer Olympics, organized by the world's governing body, the FIVB in conjunction with the IOC. It was held in Seoul, South Korea from 17 September to 2 October 1988.

Qualification

* Cuba withdrew because of the North Korea-led boycott and were replaced by Italy, who won the best-of-three playoff against China.

Pools composition

Rosters

Venues

Preliminary round

Pool A

|}

|}

Pool B

|}

|}

Final round

9th–12th places

9th–12th semifinals

|}

11th place match

|}

9th place match

|}

5th–8th places

5th–8th semifinals

|}

7th place match

|}

5th place match

|}

Final four

Semifinals

|}

Bronze medal match

|}

Gold medal match

|}

Final standing

Medalists

Awards

Most Valuable Player
 Karch Kiraly
Best Spiker
 Andrea Gardini
Best Blocker
 Steve Timmons
Best Server
 Ron Zwerver

Best Digger
 Eizaburo Mitsuhashi
Best Setter
 Ferdinando De Giorgi
Best Receiver
 Bob Ctvrtlik

References

External links
Final Standing (1964–2000)
Results at Todor66.com 
Results at Sports123.com

O
Volleyball at the 1988 Summer Olympics
Men's events at the 1988 Summer Olympics